Dhanyam is a 2012 Indian Malayalam-language film directed by debutant Jayalal, starring newcomers Pratheesh Nandan and Pooja in the lead roles.

Plot
Dhanyam tells about the virtues of Kerala village life and culture.

References

2010s Malayalam-language films
2012 directorial debut films
2012 romance films
2012 films
Indian romance films